Bassingthorpe is a small village in the South Kesteven district of Lincolnshire, England.

The village contains 4 houses and a Grade I listed church dedicated to St Thomas. The ecclesiastical parish is part of The North Beltisloe Group of parishes, of the Deanery of Beltisloe in the Diocese of Lincoln. From 2006 to 2011 the incumbent was Rev Richard Ireson.

References

External links
 
 
    Location map of Bassingthorpe
Aerial view of Bassingthorpe
 

Villages in Lincolnshire
Grade I listed buildings in Lincolnshire
South Kesteven District